Acqua Fragile was an italian progressive rock band, active from 1971 to 1975. The band was established in the city of Parma. , leader and vocalist of the band, is best known for his work with Premiata Forneria Marconi and has played in many other progressive rock acts, including neoprogressive band Mangala Vallis.

History
The first lineup of the band, named "Gli Immortali" ("The Immortals") comprised  (vocals), Gino Campanini (electric guitar), Piero Canavera (drums), Maurizio Mori (keyboards) and Franz Dondi (bass guitar). Of those, Dondi was the most established musician, as he had formerly played in another small band, "I Moschettieri" ("The Musketeers") which had released a single and opened for Rolling Stones.

At the beginning of the 1970s, Gli Immortali were noticed by members of the PFM (one of most successful italian rock bands of the times), and PFM's manager Franco Mamone adopted Lanzetti's group as well, which had by then changed its name to "Acqua Fragile". With Mamone's help, Acqua Fragile were hired to open for progressive rock prominent acts such as Soft Machine, Uriah Heep and Gentle Giant.

In 1973 the band released a first,  for independent record label Rocket. This debut work was clearly inspired by British progressive rock bands Genesis and Gentle Giant, and had English lyrics, something quite unusual for Italian bands at the time, even more so since the album was not released outside of Italy. Even Lanzetti's voice sounded very much like that of Peter Gabriel.

The next album  (1974) was released in both Italy and the United States, a move that was intended to leverage from PFM's recent success overseas. At about the same time the new keyboardist Joe Vescovi (formerly with The Trip) moved in. Shortly thereafter Lanzetti, leader and vocalist of the band, left to join PFM for their next album Chocolate Kings. The band replaced Lanzetti with Roby Facini (former member of Top 4 and Dik Dik), but this did not revive the success of Acqua Fragile. The band eventually split in 1975.

After the breakup, Acqua Fragile members pursued independent projects. Lanzetti has had a relatively successful solo career and later joined neoprogressive group Mangala Vallis. Dondi and Canavera played in several groups (including a Beatles tribute band). Dondi has recently founded a new project, called "Acqua Fragile Project", as a revival act in honor of Acqua Fragile.

Discography

Albums
  (Rocket 1973; republished on CD by BMG in 1991 and 2003)
  (DJM 1974, republished on LP and CD by Contempo in 1991 and on CD by BMG in 2003)
 Live in Emilia (live, Prehistoric 1994)
 A New Chant (Cherry Red 2017)

Notes

External links
Acqua Fragile Project official site
Franz Dondi official site

Italian progressive rock groups
Rocket Records artists
DJM Records artists